Johann Sulzer may refer to:

 Johann Georg Sulzer (1720–1779), Swiss mathematician and philosopher
 Johann Heinrich Sulzer (1735–1813), Swiss entomologist
 Johann Jakob Sulzer (1821–1897), Swiss politician